Ajay Thakur (born 1 May 1986) is an Indian professional Kabaddi player and the former captain of the Indian National Kabaddi Team. He was part of the national teams which won 2016 Kabaddi World Cup and gold medal at 2014 Asian Games. He was awarded the Padma Shri and Arjuna Award in 2019.

He is a member of Himachal Pradesh Police Service cadre who currently serves as Deputy superintendent of police.

Early life 
Thakur was born in Dabhota village of Nalagarh, Himachal Pradesh to Rajinder Kaur and Chottu Ram. He was inspired by his cousin Rakesh who had already represented India in Kabaddi at international level. He married Sandeep Rana on April 10, 2019.

Career 
Ajay Thakur has been described as one of the best Indian raiders. He represented his employer Air India at the Industrial National Championships. He has also captained India team in 2017 and led them to gold. He will also lead the Himachal men's team at the 67th Senior Nationals Kabaddi Championship 2020.

He is a member of Himachal Pradesh Police Service cadre who currently serves as Deputy superintendent of police.

Pro Kabaddi League

In Season 1, Thakur played 15 matches and scored 122 raid points as well as 5 tackle points while playing for Bengaluru Bulls.

In season 2, Thakur played 13 matches and scored 79 raid points as well as 1 tackle point while playing for Bengaluru Bulls.

In season 3, Thakur played 14 matches and scored 52 raid points as well as 4 tackle points while playing for Puneri Paltan.

In season 4, Thakur played 16 matches and scored 63 raid points as well as 1 tackle point while playing for Puneri Paltan.

In season 5, Ajay Thakur played 22 matches and scored 213 raid points as well as 9 tackle points while playing for Tamil Thalaivas.

In season 6, Ajay Thakur played 22 matches and scored 203 raid points as well as 1 tackle point while playing for Tamil Thalaivas.

In season 7, Ajay Thakur played 13 matches and scored 58 raid points while playing for Tamil Thalaivas.

Kabaddi World Cup 2016
He was the no.1 raider with most raid points and Ajay was the overall highest point scorer with 68 points.

India while playing Iran in the Kabaddi World Cup 2016 final, was in a trailing situation. In this situation, came Ajay scoring a 4-point raid to take India to the lead. He was also the Man of the Tournament in Kabaddi World Cup 2016.

Thakur was placed fourth among the best performing raiders in Season 1 of Pro kabaddi league.

Achievements 
His awards and achievements include:
 Asian Indoor and Martial Arts Games Kabaddi - Gold Medal [2013]
 Gold Medal at Kabaddi at the 2007 Asian Indoor Games
 2014 Asian Games - Gold Medal.
 Asian Kabaddi Championship 2017(Gorgan, Iran) - Gold Medal.
 World Cup 2016 (Ahmedabad, India) - Gold medal
Asian Games 2018 (Jakarta, Indonesia)- Bronze Medal
 Padma Shri award (2019)
 Arjuna Award (2019)

References 

1986 births
Living people
Indian kabaddi players
Asian Games medalists in kabaddi
Kabaddi players at the 2014 Asian Games
Kabaddi players at the 2018 Asian Games
Kabaddi players from Himachal Pradesh
People from Solan district
Asian Games gold medalists for India
Asian Games bronze medalists for India
Medalists at the 2014 Asian Games
Medalists at the 2018 Asian Games
Recipients of the Padma Shri in sports
Recipients of the Arjuna Award
Pro Kabaddi League players